Telem is an Israeli settlement in the West Bank. Organized as a communal settlement, it is located in the southern Judean Hills region, west of Kiryat Arba, it falls under the jurisdiction of Har Hevron Regional Council.

The international community considers Israeli settlements in the West Bank illegal under international law, but the Israeli government disputes this.

History
According to ARIJ, Israel confiscated about 1000 dunams of land from the nearby Palestinian town of Tarqumiyah in order to construct Telem.

The settlement was established on 31 January 1982 as a pioneering Nahal military outpost and demilitarized only a year later when turned over for residential purposes in the form of a non-religious cooperative village (Hebrew: מושב שיתופי, moshav shitufi) belonging to the Herut Betar movement. In 1995, with the assistance of the Amana settlement organization, houses were built.

In 2004, a group of about twenty religious families joined the village in order to strengthen and build a mixed community. In the centre of the village, a Beit Midrash was established and named the 'Netivot Dror Yeshiva' in memory of Dror Weinberg, an Israel Defense Forces army colonel who, as of 2007, was the highest ranking Israeli soldier to be killed during the Second Intifada.

The community still has agriculture including grape vineyards and chicken coops. Its original name was Mitzpe Guvrin since it overlooks the Beit Guvrin region.

References

External links
Netivot Dror Yeshiva

Mixed Israeli settlements
Nahal settlements
Populated places established in 1982
1982 establishments in the Palestinian territories
Community settlements
Israeli settlements in the West Bank